Cilok is an Indonesian ball-shaped dumpling made from aci (tapioca starch), a Sundanese snack originated from Indonesia. In Sundanese, cilok is an abbreviation of aci dicolok or "poked tapioca", since the tapioca balls are poked with lidi skewers made from the midrib of the coconut palm frond. 

The size of cilok balls may vary, but it is usually about the same size as another Indonesian favourite bakso meatballs. Cilok balls are boiled until cooked or deep fried in ample of cooking oil, and might be served with peanut sauce, kecap manis (sweet soy sauce), sambal, bottled chili sauce, or served in soup. The texture of cilok is quite chewy, its shape and texture is quite similar to Japanese dango, although almost all of cilok variants are savoury compared to sweet dango.

Cilok is a popular street snack, usually sold by travelling vendors using cart or bicycle frequenting residential areas, marketplace, busy street-side, or stationed in front of a school. The chewy tapioca balls with savoury peanut sauce is a popular snack among Indonesian school children.

Types and variants
Basic or common cilok usually are tapioca balls skewered and served in peanut sauce. However, there are numbers of variants of additions, fillings and sauce depends on the creativity of the cooks. An example is cilok filled with quail egg served in ebi dried shrimp sauce.
The many different varieties of cilok are usually named after the various additional ingredients seasonings served with it. Types and variants among others are:
Cilok biasa Common simple cilok sold by street vendors. Usually plain tapioca balls (without fillings) skewered and served in peanut sauce, sweet soy sauce and sambal chili sauce, placed inside a plastic pouch. 
Cilok daging Meat cilok with the addition of minced beef into tapioca dough, almost similar to beef bakso meatball.
Cilok kuah Refer to cilok served in broth soup in similar fashion as bakso meatballs.
 Similar to cilok kuah; served in broth soup, but  is far more hot and spicy due to generous addition of  chili sauce.
Cilok isi ayam Cilok filled with seasoned chicken meat.
 Derived from Sundanese abbreviation aci di-gemol (round-shaped aci), with gemol being a Sundanese word meaning "make into a rounded shape". The preparation method for  involves deep frying the tapioca balls and then sprinkled with chili powder.
 Also derived from Sundanese abbreviation aci telor (aci with fried egg), which is skewered aci balls deep fried with egg batter coatings. Usually  are seasoned with powdered flavorings, sambal chili sauce or sweet soy sauce.

Gallery

See also

 Bakso
 Dango
 Pentol
 Tteok-bokki
 Tapioca balls
 List of dumplings

References

External links
 Cilok Recipes

Sundanese cuisine
Dumplings
Street food in Indonesia
Cassava dishes